The Micheldever Syncline is one of a series of parallel east-west trending 
folds in the Cretaceous chalk of Hampshire. It lies at the western end of the South Downs, immediately to the north of the Stockbridge Anticline and east of Salisbury Plain.

Structure
The central area of the fold axis is followed by the valley of the River Dever, which turns south-west at Bransbury to cut across the structure and the Stockbridge Anticline to the south.

Parallel folds to the south include the Stockbridge Anticline and the Winchester-King's Somborne Syncline. As with other nearby folds, the structure is controlled by movement of fault blocks within the Jurassic strata below.

See also
 List of geological folds in Great Britain

References

Geology of Hampshire